PO More Shipyard (originally Yuzhnaya Toka, Southern Stream) is a shipyard located in Feodosia, Crimea.

Its most prominent productions are the Zubr-class LCAC ship, military corvettes patrol boats and hydrofoil, and civilian Raketa, Meteorit, Kometa, Zarya and Voskhod fast hydrofoil boats.

History
Following Russia's annexation of Crimea the company was taken over by the Russian federal government with the legal form of a Federal State Unitary Enterprise. As of 2016 the shipyard is building a Karakurt-class corvette for Russia's Black Sea Fleet, with funds from the Russian National Commercial Bank.

List of products
 Muravey-class patrol boat Project 133 Antares, hydrofoil patrol boat
 Zubr-class, Air-cushioned landing crafts
 Project 22800 Storm Okhotsk and Tsiklon (Karakurt) corvettes
 Lvov (U201) and Lughansk (U203) Pr 11451 Sokol (Pr 1124), Lutzk Pr11240MU Albatross (U205)
 Project 1124 Albatros (Grisha) 
 Project 11451 Sokol (Mukha) (Pr 1124), Pr 1141
 Project 1240 Uragan (Sarancha)
 Project 1241 Molnya (Tarantul), Pr 12412
 Project 1400 Grif (Zhuk) , Pr1400M, Project 14670, Project 1450
 Project 133RA Antares RA stealth version (looking like Visby class but around half the size length)

Building

References

External links
Official website of the More Ship 

Shipbuilding companies of Crimea
Shipbuilding companies of the Soviet Union
1938 establishments in the Soviet Union
Feodosia Municipality
Federal State Unitary Enterprises of Russia
Ukroboronprom
Enterprises of Feodosia